Antoine de La Fosse (alias Sieur d'Aubigny; 1653 or 1658 – 2 November 1708) , was a French playwright who wrote four tragedies, and was the last French author of tragedies to make a name for himself at the end of the 17th century.

The son of a goldsmith and the nephew of painter Charles de La Fosse, Antoine served first as the secretary for the Envoy of France to Florence. La Fosse was then attached to Marquis Francois Joseph Créquy (1662–1702) who died in the Battle of Luzzara on 15 August 1702, before he became secretary for the 2nd Duke of Aumont Louis-Marie-Victor d'Aumont (1632–1704).

La Fosse translated the odes of Anacreon to French (Traduction nouvelle des odes d'Anacreon, sur l'original grec) in 1704, and popular with contemporaries the second edition was published in 1706. German classicist  (1701–1756) praised the French verse translation.

La Fosse's chef d'œuvre Manlius Capitolinus (1698) about Marcus Manlius Capitolinus (died ), was imitated from the English dramatist Thomas Otway's play Venice Preserv'd, who in turn had taken his plot from César Vichard de Saint-Réal's Conjuration des Espagnols contre la République de Venise en l'Année M. DC. XVIII (1674). La Fosse's later plays were not as successful, but according to theater historian Phyllis Hartnoll in The Oxford Companion to the Theatre, many of his contemporaries thought he might have rivalled Jean Racine had he began his dramatic career earlier.

His collected plays were popular for more than a century and were re-published multiple times in the 18th and 19th century, e.g. in two quarto volumes in 1747 (Nouvelle edition - "new edition"), and in 1811 in two octavo volumes.

Among his other works of elegies, odes, epigrams, poems, and cantatas is an ode written in Italian, a language he became fluent in while in Florence, which earned him a membership of Accademia degli Apatisti.

La Fosse is interred in St-Gervais-et-St-Protais, Paris.

Selected works

Plays 
 Polyxène (premiere February 3, 1686)
 Manlius Capitolinus (premiere January 18, 1698)
 Thesée (premiere 5 January 1700)
 Corésus Callirhoé (premiere December 7, 1703)

References 

1653 births
1708 deaths
French translators
Writers from Paris
17th-century French dramatists and playwrights
18th-century French dramatists and playwrights
17th-century French poets
17th-century French male writers
18th-century French male writers
17th-century French translators
18th-century French translators